The first series of Handmade: Britain's Best Woodworker started on 21 October 2021 and aired for eight episodes concluding on 25 November 2021. The series was hosted by Mel Giedroyc, with judges Alex de Rijke and Helen Welch.  Filming took place at the Glanusk Estate in the Brecon Beacons National Park.

Woodworkers

Results and eliminations

Colour key:

 Woodworker got through to the next round.
 Woodworker was eliminated.
 Woodworker won immunity from elimination.
 Woodworker of the week.
 Woodworker was a series runner-up.
 Woodworker was the series winner.

Episodes
 Woodworker eliminated  
 Woodworker of the week 
 Woodworker won immunity 
 Winner

Episode 1

Mel Giedroyc welcomes nine passionate enthusiast woodworkers to the workshop, where they are challenged to build a bed of dreams in just two days.

Episode 2

The Big Build challenge this week is to build a doll's house. With just 2 days to build what would normally take weeks, the pressure is on.

Episode 3

The woodworkers must bend and build their way to create chairs that could become design classics - and they have just two days to do it. Plus, the judges have a nasty surprise up their sleeves with a double elimination.

Episode 4

The five remaining woodworkers take on animal sculptures. They must chainsaw and carve their way through this colossal big build and unleash their inner beasts as they attempt to uncover the animal within the wood in just 2 days.

Episode 5: Semi-Final

In the semi-final, the remaining woodworkers are asked to make a drinks cabinet inspired by a particular decade - the ultimate test of joinery, craftsmanship and design.

Episode 6: Final

The three remaining woodworkers tackle their biggest build yet - towering garden buildings - in a bid to impress judges Alex de Rijke and Helen Welch, and be crowned Britain's best woodworker.

References

2021 British television seasons
Handmade: Britain's Best Woodworker